Dennis Cholowski (born February 15, 1998) is a Canadian professional ice hockey defenceman for the Bridgeport Islanders of the American Hockey League (AHL) while under contract with the New York Islanders of the National Hockey League (NHL). Cholowski was drafted 20th overall by the Detroit Red Wings in the 2016 NHL Entry Draft, and has also briefly played for the Washington Capitals.

Playing career

Junior
During the 2015–16 season, Cholowski recorded 12 goals and 28 assists in 50 games for the Chilliwack Chiefs. He led the Chiefs' defencemen in scoring, and finished fifth among BCHL defencemen with 40 points. In the playoffs, he finished first in postseason scoring by a defenceman with four goals and 11 assists in 20 games. He was named to the 2016 BCHL Second All-Star Team.

College
During the 2016–17 season, in his freshman season, Cholowski recorded one goal and 11 assists in 36 games for the St. Cloud State Huskies.

Major junior
On September 26, 2017, Cholowski was assigned to the Prince George Cougars of the Western Hockey League. On November 21, 2017, Cholowski was named captain of the Cougars.

On January 10, 2018, Cholowski was traded to the Portland Winterhawks, along with Ty Taylor, in exchange for Ilijah Colina, Connor Bowie, a first-round pick in 2020, a second-round pick in 2018, a second-round pick in 2019, and a third-round pick in 2020. Prior to being traded, he recorded 13 goals and 26 assists in 39 games for the Cougars, ranking second in the WHL in goals by a defenceman, and sixth in points. He finished his first major junior campaign with 14 goals and 52 assists in 69 games between Prince George and Portland. He ranked among the WHL's top defencemen in points (8th), goals (T6th) and assists (8th).

Professional
On April 5, 2017, the Detroit Red Wings signed Cholowski to a three-year, entry-level contract. On April 7, Cholowski was signed to an amateur tryout by the Grand Rapids Griffins. On April 18, 2018, Cholowski was reassigned to the Grand Rapids Griffins of the American Hockey League. He made his professional debut for the Griffins on April 25, in a game against the Manitoba Moose, registering one shot on goal.

The following season, Cholowski made the Red Wings opening night roster out of training camp. He made his NHL debut for the Red Wings on October 4, 2018, and scored his first career NHL goal in the second period against Joonas Korpisalo of the Columbus Blue Jackets. On February 14, 2019, Cholowski was assigned to the Grand Rapids Griffins. Prior to being assigned to the Griffins, he recorded seven goals and nine assists in 52 games for the Red Wings, ranking third in points among rookie defencemen in the NHL.

On July 21, 2021, Cholowski was selected by the Seattle Kraken in the 2021 NHL Expansion Draft and later signed a one-year, $900,000 deal with the team. On October 13, 2021, he was placed on waivers and was claimed by the Washington Capitals. Cholowski used by the Capitals primarily as a depth defenceman and healthy scratch, featured in just seven games registering one assist.

On February 8, 2022, Cholowski was waived by the Capitals and was subsequently re-claimed by Seattle. He was immediately re-assigned by the Kraken to join AHL affiliate, the Charlotte Checkers.

On August 23, 2022, Cholowski as a free agent signed a two-year, two-way contract in joining his fourth NHL club, the New York Islanders.

Career statistics

References

External links
 

1998 births
Living people
Bridgeport Islanders players
Canadian ice hockey defencemen
Charlotte Checkers (2010–) players
Chilliwack Chiefs players
Detroit Red Wings draft picks
Detroit Red Wings players
Grand Rapids Griffins players
Ice hockey people from British Columbia
National Hockey League first-round draft picks
New York Islanders players
People from Langley, British Columbia (city)
Portland Winterhawks players
Prince George Cougars players
Seattle Kraken players
St. Cloud State Huskies men's ice hockey players
Washington Capitals players